Vespamantoida wherleyi is a species of praying mantis that mimics a wasp. It was discovered in 2013 at a research station near the Amazon River in northern Peru. The discovery resulted in erecting a new genus, Vespamantoida. This mantis has a red/orange colored body and black pattern. Besides the coloration, it has the body shape of and displayed walking and antenna movements similar to a wasp. This mantis is closely related to Mantoida toulgoeti as both species have a distinct foreleg synapomorphy.

References

Mantoididae
Biota of Peru
Insects described in 2019